Kyrgyzstan participated in the 1998 Asian Games held in Bangkok, Thailand from December 6, 1998, to December 20, 1998. Athletes from Kyrgyzstan succeeded in winning three silvers and same number of bronzes, making total six medals. Kyrgyzstan finished at 24th position in a medal table.

References

Nations at the 1998 Asian Games
1998
Asian Games